Anping may refer to:

China
Anping County, of Hengshui, Hebei
Anping, Cenxi, in Cenxi City, Guangxi
Anping, Anping County, in Anping County, Hebei
Anping, Xianghe County, in Xianghe County, Hebei
Anping, Zhecheng County, in Zhecheng County, Henan
Anping, Anren County, in Anren County, Hunan
Anping, Lianyuan, in Lianyuan City, Hunan
Anping, Chenxi (安坪镇), a town of Chenxi County, Hunan
Anhai, formerly named Anping, in Jinjiang, Fujian
Anping Bridge, near Anai, Jinjiang, Fujian

Taiwan
Anping, Tainan, a district in Tainan
Fort Zeelandia (Taiwan), or Fort Anping (安平古堡), the oldest colonial fortress in Taiwan
Pingzhen District, district in Taoyuan City, formerly the town of Anping

See also
Ping'an (disambiguation), written with the same Chinese characters in the reverse order